Asahiko (written: 朝彦) is a masculine Japanese given name. Notable people with the name include:

, Japanese prince
, Japanese politician

Japanese masculine given names